Orchis brancifortii is a species of orchid endemic to Sardinia, Sicily, and southern Italy.

References 

brancifortii
Flora of Sardinia
Flora of Sicily
Orchids of Europe
Endemic flora of Italy